Fort Massachusetts can refer to:
Fort Massachusetts (Colorado), the first permanent U.S. military post in the State of Colorado
Fort Massachusetts (Florida)
Fort Massachusetts (Massachusetts)
Fort Massachusetts (Mississippi)
Fort Stevens (Washington, D.C.), was originally called Fort Massachusetts